Alex Murdoch (1875–1958) was an Australian rules footballer

Alex Murdoch may also refer to:

 Alex Murdoch (singer), a participant in the UK series of The X Factor
 Alex Murdoch, participant in series two of Dirty Dancing: The Time of Your Life 
 Alex Murdoch, Chair of Governors of Oxted School 
 Alex Murdaugh, subject of a high-profile murder case in South Carolina, see Trial of Alex Murdaugh

See also
 Alexi Murdoch (born 1973), a British folk musician and songwriter